Yeshiva Ohr Yisrael of Atlanta is a private, Orthodox Jewish high school for boys in Atlanta, Georgia, United States.

References

External links 
 

Mesivtas
Schools in Atlanta
Private high schools in Georgia (U.S. state)
Jews and Judaism in Atlanta
Orthodox yeshivas in the United States